Herman Riddle Page Jr. (May 3, 1892 – November 10, 1977) was an American prelate of the Episcopal Church who served as the fifth Bishop of Northern Michigan from 1942 till 1964.

Early life, education, and family
Page was born on May 3, 1892 in Coeur d'Alene, Idaho, the son of the Reverend Herman R. Page who later became the forth Bishop of Northern Michigan, and Mary Moorhead. He was educated in the Hyde Park High School in Boise, Idaho, and then studied at Harvard University, from where he graduated with a Bachelor of Arts in 1913, and a postgraduate degree in 1914. He also attended the Episcopal Theological School and earned a Bachelor of Sacred Theology in 1917. Page married Lois Dickinson on June 25, 1922 and together had one son. Lois died in 1930, and Page married Gwendolyn Byllesby Cummins on June 26, 1933.

Ordained ministry
Page was ordained deacon on August 6, 1916, and priest in May 1917, on both occasions by his father Herman R. Page. After ordination, Page became an army chaplain and served till 1919. In 1918 he Chaplain of the 13th Division. He then served as priest-in-charge of St John's Church in Okanogan, Washington and St Paul's Church in Omak, Washington between 1919 and 1922, and then as priest-in-charge of St Luke's Church in Wenatchee, Washington from 1922 till 1923. In 1923, he was appointed rector of St Michael's Church in Yakima, Washington, while in 1925, he became assistant priest at St Paul's Cathedral in Boston. Between 1927 and 1942, he served as rector of St Paul's Church in Dayton, Ohio. He also served as an army chaplain between 1941 and 1942 during WWII.

Bishop
Page's father died in April 1942, and he was elected on the first ballot to succeed him as Bishop of Northern Michigan on May 26, 1942 during the annual diocesan convention. He was consecrated on October 23, 1942 in St Paul's Church, Dayton, Ohio by Presiding Bishop Henry St. George Tucker. He also served as a member of the Michigan Civil Defence Council, chaplain of the Michigan State Police, and president of the Province of Midwest between 1951 and 1957. Page retired in 1964 and served at Holy Innocents Church in Little Lake, Michigan. He
died in November 1977 of a heart attack.

References

1892 births
1977 deaths
Harvard University alumni
Episcopal Divinity School alumni
People from Coeur d'Alene, Idaho
United States Army chaplains
20th-century Anglican bishops in the United States
United States Army personnel of World War II
Episcopal bishops of Northern Michigan